Penicillium implicatum is an anamorph species of the genus of Penicillium which causes postharvest rot on pomegranate. Penicillium implicatum produces Citrinin

References

Further reading
 
 
 
 
 

implicatum
Fungi described in 1923